The 2006 Illinois gubernatorial election took place on November 7, 2006. Incumbent Democratic Governor Rod Blagojevich won re-election to a second four-year term scheduled to have ended on January 10, 2011.  However, Blagojevich did not complete his term, as he was impeached and removed from office in 2009. This was the first election since 1964 that a Democrat was re-elected governor. 

Many observers expected the race to be close, especially considering the polling, which had shown Governor Blagojevich to have a high disapproval rating. However, the Republicans had fared poorly due to scandals involving prior Governor George Ryan, and the increasingly unpopular presidency of George W. Bush. Exit polls showed Topinka won white voters (46%-41%-13%), while Blagojevich performed well among African Americans (80%-16%-2%) and Latinos (83%-12%-4%).

Election information
The primaries and general elections coincided with those for Congress and those for other state offices. The election was part of the 2006 Illinois elections.

Turnout

For the primaries, turnout for the gubernatorial primaries was 23.13%, with 1,680,207 votes cast and turnout for the lieutenant gubernatorial primaries was 20.60% with 1,496,453 votes cast. For the general election, turnout was 47.29%, with 3,487,989 votes cast.

Democratic primaries

Governor

Candidates
Rod Blagojevich, incumbent Governor of Illinois
Edwin Eisendrath, former Chicago Alderman and former HUD official

Results

Lieutenant governor

Candidates
Pat Quinn, incumbent Lieutenant Governor of Illinois
Pamela R. Schadow

Results

Republican primaries

Governor

Candidates
Bill Brady, Illinois State Senator
Ron Gidwitz, businessman and former Chairman of the Illinois State Board of Education
Andy Martin, perennial candidate
Jim Oberweis, owner of Oberweis Dairy
Judy Baar Topinka, Illinois State Treasurer

Declined
Jim Edgar, former governor

Campaign
On November 7, 2005, Topinka announced that she would not seek re-election as state treasurer — instead, she entered the gubernatorial primary, hoping to challenge Democratic Governor Rod Blagojevich. The Republican primary was deeply divisive; her tenure as Party Chairman destroyed her support from the conservative wing of her party, and it was feared that her pro-choice and positive gay rights positions would be detrimental to her standing with the same conservatives. In December she announced that she would join forces with DuPage County State's Attorney Joe Birkett as a candidate for Lieutenant Governor of Illinois.

In February 2006, the candidates for the Republican nomination for Illinois Governor began running their first TV ads for the March statewide primary election. Rival candidate Ron Gidwitz's advertisements, attacking Topinka, were rebuked in the same week by the Illinois Republican Party: "In an unprecedented action, the Illinois Republican Party has officially rebuked the Gidwitz campaign for this ad because the Party found that the ad violates the Party's "Code of Conduct", which was enacted to police proper conduct among Republican candidates."

Later in February, candidate Jim Oberweis, another rival for the Republican Gubernatorial nomination, started a series of attack ads for television markets, against Topinka, that were even more widely criticized, mostly for using "fake" headlines on the images of actual Illinois newspapers. These ads, like Gidwitz's ads, also came under review by the Illinois Republican Party. Because of the controversy generated, several television stations withdrew Oberweis's ads.  A number of media outlets reported that Oberweis received a significant absolute number of write-in votes in the November general election, and he spontaneously re-appeared in some polls in October 2006 at up to 2 per cent, all apparently without endorsement or co-ordination by the candidate or his organisation . . . the official count was 20 607 votes or a little over 0.59 per cent (see below); where this fits in terms of standard deviation and other normal curve statistics has not been published.

Results

Lieutenant governor

Candidates
Joe Birkett, DuPage County State's Attorney
Lawrence Bruckner, lawyer
Jeremy Bryan Cole
Steve Rauschenberger, member of the Illinois Senate
Sandy Wegman, Kane County Recorder

Results

General election

Candidates

On ballot
 Rod Blagojevich (Democratic Party), incumbent Governor of Illinois
 Judy Baar Topinka (Republican Party), Illinois State Treasurer
 Rich Whitney (Green Party), attorney

Write-ins

Marvin Koch, Chicago-area property manager and naval reservist.
Mark McCoy (Libertarian Party), legal Scholar and Rights Defender
Angel Rivera, lung transplant procurement coordinator at the University of Chicago Medical Center
Randy Stufflebeam, Illinois Constitution Party chairman, USMC veteran and church activist
Mike Shorten

Predictions

Polling

Results

Blagojevich was declared the winner by 10:00 p.m.

Aftermath

The Green Party became an established political party statewide, according to Illinois state election law, when Rich Whitney received more than 5% of the total vote for governor. The new status provided the party with several new advantages, such as lower signature requirements for ballot access, primary elections, free access to additional voter data, the ability to elect precinct committeemen, run a partial slate of candidates at any jurisdictional level, and slate candidates without petitioning. The only other statewide established political parties were the Democratic and Republican Parties.  It is rare for a new political party to become established statewide in Illinois, the last to do so being the Solidarity Party in 1986 and the Progressive Party before that.

See also
2006 Illinois elections
2006 United States gubernatorial elections
2006 United States House of Representatives elections in Illinois

References

External links
Official campaign websites (Archived)
Whitney's Campaign Website
Blagojevich's Campaign Website
Topinka's Campaign Website
Stufflebeam's Campaign Website
Mark McCoy's Campaign Website
Koch's Campaign Website
Quinn's Campaign Website
Birkett's Campaign Website

Governor
2006
Illinois
Rod Blagojevich